Upper Souris National Wildlife Refuge, located  northwest of Minot, North Dakota, was established in 1935 as a refuge and breeding ground for migratory birds and other wildlife. The refuge straddles  of the picturesque Souris River valley in northern North Dakota. The Souris River basin figures prominently in the cultural and natural history of the North American mid-continent plains and prairies.

The  refuge includes a narrow band of river bottom woodlands, fertile floodplains, native mixed-grass hills, and steep, shrub-covered coulees. The focal point of the refuge is the  Lake Darling, a reservoir created by the Lake Darling Dam, which was constructed in 1936 to provide water to downstream marshes on J. Clark Salyer and Upper Souris National Wildlife Refuges.

The American Bird Conservancy has designated the refuge as a Globally Important Bird Area. Lake Darling is also designated as critical habitat for the endangered piping plover.

Bird watchers come from across the nation to search for small grassland nesting bird species including Baird's, Le Conte's, and Nelson's sharp-tailed sparrows, as well as the Sprague's pipit.

See also 
 Lower Souris National Wildlife Refuge Airplane Hangar

References
Refuge website

External links

Important Bird Areas of North Dakota
National Wildlife Refuges in North Dakota
Protected areas established in 1935
Protected areas of Ward County, North Dakota
Protected areas of Renville County, North Dakota
Historic American Engineering Record in North Dakota
Wetlands of North Dakota
Landforms of Ward County, North Dakota
Landforms of Renville County, North Dakota